The West Trenton Line is a SEPTA Regional Rail service connecting Center City Philadelphia to the West Trenton section of Ewing Township, New Jersey. With around 12,000 riders every weekday, it is the third busiest line in the SEPTA Regional Rail network.

Route 

The West Trenton Line connects Center City Philadelphia with the West Trenton section of Ewing, New Jersey. The line splits from the SEPTA Main Line at Jenkintown, running northeast on the Neshaminy Line. At Bethayres, it crosses the Pennypack Trail that runs along the former Philadelphia, Newtown and New York Railroad, which once connected with the Fox Chase Line. At Oakford, the former New York Short Line Railroad, once part of the Reading's main line to West Trenton and Jersey City and currently CSX's Trenton Subdivision, merges. North of Oakford, the West Trenton Line runs parallel to CSX's Trenton Subdivision. The West Trenton Railroad Bridge, a concrete arch bridge, crosses the Delaware River to the final stop at West Trenton.

History 

Like all of the Reading Company's commuter lines, the West Trenton Line was electrified in the early 1930s and has a mix of at-grade and grade separated crossings. Electrified service to West Trenton was opened on July 26, 1931. The RDG planned to also electrify tracks between West Trenton and the CNJ Terminal in Jersey City for long-distance service, but had to drop plans for electrification outside of the commuter service area due to economic setbacks as a result of the Great Depression.

The line north of the split at Jenkintown was originally built as the National Railway project, opened on May 1, 1876, to provide an alternate to the United New Jersey Railroad and Canal Companies' monopoly over Philadelphia-New York City travel. From Jenkintown to the Delaware River it was built by the North Pennsylvania Railroad as a branch, while the New Jersey section was built by the Delaware and Bound Brook Railroad, merging with the Central Railroad of New Jersey at Bound Brook. In addition to the Reading Company, which leased the North Pennsylvania Railroad in 1879, the Baltimore and Ohio Railroad also used the line for passenger and freight service to New York City, including its famed Royal Blue service. In 1976 the Reading merged into Conrail, and in 1983 SEPTA took over operations.

Prior to 1981, limited service continued north to Newark, New Jersey (Jersey City prior to the Aldene Plan of the 1960s), using Budd Company-built Diesel multiple units. This service was the last remains of the Reading's Crusader service, which began in 1937 using streamlined steam locomotives and passenger cars. SEPTA ended service beyond West Trenton on August 1, 1981; connecting NJT diesel service lasted until December 1982. NJT has since considered service resumption on their West Trenton Line.

Beginning in 1984 the route was designated R1 West Trenton as part of SEPTA's diametrical reorganization of its lines. West Trenton Line trains operated through the city center to the Airport Line on the ex-Pennsylvania side of the system. In later years this behavior changed; the line was designated R3 West Trenton and trains continued on to the Media/Elwyn Line on weekdays and the Airport Line on weekends. The R-number naming system was dropped on July 25, 2010. , most West Trenton Line trains terminate at 30th Street Station on weekdays, while most evening trains operate to Malvern or Thorndale on the Paoli/Thorndale Line. Most weekend trains operate to Chestnut Hill West on the Chestnut Hill West Line.

Service resumed on June 15, 2020.

Stations 

The West Trenton Line includes the following stations north of the Center City Commuter Connection; stations indicated with a gray background are closed. The train expresses from Bethayres to Temple University inbound on some trains in the morning and expresses outbound from Temple University to Bethayres on some trains in the evening.

Ridership 
Between FY 2008–FY 2019 yearly ridership on the West Trenton Line has held steady at 3.3–3.5 million, except for a dip to 3 million in FY 2018.

Notes

References

External links 

SEPTA – West Trenton line schedule (PDF)
The Blue Comet - Reading Terminal to West Trenton, New Jersey

SEPTA Regional Rail